Ceranchia is a genus of moths in the family Saturniidae first described by Arthur Gardiner Butler in 1878.

It contains only one species, the ghostly silkmoth (Ceranchia apollina Butler, 1878).

References

Saturniinae